1984 Országos Bajnokság I (men's water polo) was the 78th water polo championship in Hungary.

First stage

Group I

Group II 

Pld - Played; W - Won; L - Lost; PF - Points for; PA - Points against; Diff - Difference; Pts - Points.

Final round

Semifinals 

|}

Final 

|}

3rd Place 

|}

5th Place 

|}

7th Place 

|}

9th Place 

|}

11.-14. Place 

|}

11th Place 

|}

13th Place 

|}

Sources 
Gyarmati Dezső: Aranykor (Hérodotosz Könyvkiadó és Értékesítő Bt., Budapest, 2002.)

1983 in water polo
1983 in Hungarian sport
1984 in water polo
1984 in Hungarian sport
Seasons in Hungarian water polo competitions